The 1938 UK & Ireland Greyhound Racing Year was the 13th year of greyhound racing in the United Kingdom and Ireland.

Roll of honour

Summary
1938 in the United Kingdom was a place of tension due to the unrest in Europe and the ongoing negotiations between the Prime Minister, Neville Chamberlain and Germany. However the public continued to embrace greyhound racing which was an affordable national pastime. Attendances at the National Greyhound Racing Club (NGRC) licensed tracks topped 26 million with totalisator turnover recorded as £39,352,839. The track tote deduction was 6% and the government tote tax was an additional 6%.

The leading greyhound company, the Greyhound Racing Association (GRA) significantly increased profits once again. The operating profit for 1938 was £278,000 (a substantial figure at the time) and attendances at GRA tracks increased rose to 4,408,412. The GRA also invested heavily into their breeding facility on the company owned Fan Court Farm, on the Longcross Road in Chertsey, Surrey.

Lone Keel won the 1938 English Greyhound Derby, he was jointly owned by Staines Greyhound Stadium's owner Jack Walsh and William Hill (the founder of the betting company.

Tracks
Six known tracks were opened, three of which were in Scotland. Independent tracks were common north of the border with many choosing not to apply for NGRC status and remaining as small unlicensed tracks.

Tracks opened

Competitions
Trainer Joe Harmon experienced considerable success with his pair of kennels brothers, Puppy Derby champion Junior Classic and Juvenile Classic and Trafalgar Cup champion Quarter Day. Junior Classic overcame a tough field in the Gold Collar, a competition that included 1937 English Greyhound Derby champion Wattle Bark, now trained by Leslie Reynolds and Scurry Gold Cup champion Hexham Bridge. One week earlier Juvenile Classic had jumped to glory in the Grand National.

Jesmond Cutlet made an unsuccessful attempt at defending his Scottish Greyhound Derby title, when well beaten by favourite Roe Side Scottie in July and during the same month Orlucks Best won the Scurry Gold Cup, one year after he finished runner up in the same event. Ballyhennessy Sandills retained his Laurels crown, a great achievement because the final consisted of Wattle Bark, Bealtaine and Roe Side Scottie. Quarter Day claimed the Oaks from Gretas Rosary.

Nine days later Gretas Rosary picked up the St Leger winner's prize at Wembley. The blue brindle and white bitch had a qualifying heat in between the two classic competition finals and also accounted for the Irish Greyhound Derby winner Abbeylara. Quarter Day then returned to White City, in November and won the valuable 'White City' invitation race.

Ireland
Abbeylara stood out as the leading greyhound in Ireland, the brindle dog easily won the Irish Greyhound Derby and the St Leger. He also reached the English St Leger final.

News
GRA trainer Eddie Wright moved from his Powderhall kennels to the Hook Estate and Kennels and a track attachment at Harringay and the GRA also moved Harry Buck from Belle Vue to White City.

Principal UK races

	

Key
d/h = dead heat

Totalisator Returns

The totalisator returns declared to the licensing authorities for the year 1938 are listed below. Tracks that did not have a totalisator in operation are not listed.

Summary

References 

Greyhound racing in the United Kingdom
Greyhound racing in the Republic of Ireland
Greyhound Racing Year
Greyhound Racing Year
Greyhound Racing Year
Greyhound Racing Year